Mou Ying-hsin (born 7 November 1977) is a Taiwanese breaststroke swimmer. She competed in three events at the 1996 Summer Olympics.

References

External links
 

1977 births
Living people
Taiwanese female breaststroke swimmers
Olympic swimmers of Taiwan
Swimmers at the 1996 Summer Olympics
Place of birth missing (living people)